PFAA may refer to:

 Perfluoroalkyl acids
 Professional Flight Attendants Association